Sakangyi may refer to many places in Burma:

Sakangyi, Arakan
Sakangyi, Bogale
Sakangyi, Kayan
Sakangyi, Launglon
Sakangyi, Letpatan
Sakangyi, Magwe
Sakangyi, Mogaung
Sakangyi, Myaungmya
Sakangyi, Myayde
Sakangyi, Patheingyi
Sakangyi, Sinbaungwe
 Sakangyi, Taunggyi
Sakangyi, Thaton
Sakangyi, Ye-Ngan